Ladykracher was a German sketch comedy show starring Anke Engelke. The show ran on Sat.1 from 2002 to 2004 and was produced by Brainpool. In 2008 the show was reproduced until 2013.

Skits 
All Ladykracher skits feature Anke Engelke. The promotion for the show said "The woman with 250 faces", referring Anke's talent for slipping into many different roles.

Cast

Other guest appearances
Oliver Welke in season 3
Bastian Pastewka in season 3
Lena Meyer-Landrut in season 6 (episodes 3 and 5)

See also
 German television comedy

References

External links
Official website

German comedy television series
2002 German television series debuts
2004 German television series endings
2013 German television series endings
German-language television shows
Sat.1 original programming